RNA, U2 small nuclear, also known as RNU2, is a human gene.

References

Further reading

Pseudogenes